Mechid TV is a private television channel of Hazara people based in Quetta, Pakistan.

See also

Rah-e-Farda Radio & Television Network
Negaah TV

References

Hazaragi-language television stations
Quetta District